Evanescence is the debut studio large-ensemble jazz album by American composer Maria Schneider. It was released in 1994 by Enja Records.

Track listing

Personnel

 Maria Schnieder – conductor
 Mark Vinci – alto saxophone, flute, alto flute, clarinet, piccolo
 Tim Ries – alto saxophone, soprano saxophone, flute, clarinet
 Rich Perry – tenor saxophone, flute
 Rick Margitza – tenor saxophone
 Scott Robinson – baritone saxophone, bass saxophone, bass clarinet, clarinet
 Tony Kadleck – trumpet, flügelhorn
 Greg Gisbert – trumpet, flügelhorn
 Laurie Frink – trumpet, flügelhorn
 Tim Hagans – trumpet, flügelhorn
 John Fedchock – trombone
 Keith O'Quinn – trombone
 Larry Farrell – trombone
 George Flynn – bass trombone, tuba
 Ben Monder – guitar
 Kenny Werner – piano
 Jay Anderson – bass guitar
 Dennis Mackrel – drums
 Emidin Rivera – percussion on "Gush"
 Bill Hayes – flexatone on "Gush"

References

External links
 Official website 

1994 debut albums
Big band albums
Enja Records albums
Experimental big band albums
Maria Schneider (musician) albums